Tarık Galip Somer (1926–1997) was Turkish academic.

He was born in 1926 in Develi ilçe (district) of Kayseri Province. His father's name was Mehmet and his mother's name was Elmas. He obtained his BS degree in Rensselaer Polytechnic Institute, United States, MS in Massachusetts Institute of Technology and PhD in University of Maryland. Following university he worked as a research engineer in Dupont Co. between 1954–56.

Academic life
After returning to Turkey, he served in Middle East Technical University, Ankara (METU). Between 1958–1970 he was the founding  dean of Chemical Engineering Department of METU. Between 1973–1974 he was the vice rector (president) of METU. Between 1974–1976 he was the rector of METU. In 1976–1977 term he lectured in Technische Hochschule in Darmstadt, Germany as a visiting professor. Between 1982–1987 he was the rector of Ankara University.

Other posts
In 1966 he served in the research and development commission of the Ministry of Defense. Between 1980–1982, he was the technical adviser in UNESCO.  During his service term in UNESCO, he contributed to the establishment of the university system in Uganda. Between 1984–1985 he was the chairmen of Turkish Universities High Council.

Death
He died in 1997.

Legacy
In METU,  Prof. Dr. Tarık Somer Academic Success Award is offered to Chemical Engineering academics.

References

People from Develi
1926 births
1997 deaths
Rensselaer Polytechnic Institute alumni
Massachusetts Institute of Technology alumni
Academic staff of Middle East Technical University
Rectors of Middle East Technical University
Rectors of Ankara University
Academic staff of Technische Universität Darmstadt